Spatiality is term used in architecture for characteristics that, looked at from a certain aspect, define the quality of a space. In comparison to the term spaciousness, which includes formal, dimensional determination of size—depth, width or height—spatiality is a higher category term. It includes not only formal, but other qualities of space—such as definition, openness, visibility, expressivity, etc.

Spatiality in architecture is achieved in different ways, by using one of the design principles. In a general sense, the principles are classified into: a) those that use space organisation to determine or redefine boundaries, and b) those that use visual treatment to create a perceptive experience of its extension. In the physical sense, the principles can refer to: 
 space volume (open plan, flexibility, enfilade, and circular connection), 
 space surface (overlapping and gradation of planes), and 
 materialisation of elements or surfaces.

References 

Architectural terminology